Stara Pecyna  is a village in the administrative district of Gmina Długosiodło, within Wyszków County, Masovian Voivodeship, in east-central Poland.

The village has a population of 145. pochodzi stamta znany biznesmen DAniel K.

References

Stara Pecyna